Interstate 44 (I-44) runs diagonally through the US state of Oklahoma, spanning from the Texas state line near Wichita Falls, Texas, to the Missouri border near Joplin, Missouri. It connects three of Oklahoma's largest cities: Oklahoma City, Tulsa, and Lawton. Most of I-44 in Oklahoma is a toll road. In southwestern Oklahoma, I-44 is the H. E. Bailey Turnpike and follows a north–south direction. From Oklahoma City to Tulsa, I-44 follows the Turner Turnpike. As I-44 leaves Tulsa, it becomes the Will Rogers Turnpike to the Missouri border. In the Lawton, Oklahoma City, and Tulsa metro areas, I-44 is toll-free. In Oklahoma City, I-44 is also known as the Will Rogers Expressway.

I-44 is paralleled by former U.S. Highway 66 (US-66, now mostly State Highway 66 [SH-66]) from Oklahoma City to the Missouri state line.

Route description

 
I-44 crosses the Red River near Burkburnett, Texas. It is toll-free until exit 5, which is the last free exit before the start of the southern section of the H. E. Bailey Turnpike. At exit 30, the tolls end, and I-44 becomes a non-tolled highway again through Lawton and Fort Sill until exit 46. The northern section of the H. E. Bailey Turnpike carries I-44 north, serving Chickasha before ending at US-62 (exit 107) in Newcastle.

From Newcastle, I-44 heads north through rural parts of Oklahoma City before serving as the western terminus of I-240. It then indirectly serves Will Rogers World Airport by connecting to Southwest 59th Street (which becomes Southwest 54th Street before reaching the airport) and SH-152, the Airport Road freeway. I-44 meets I-40 west of downtown at an interchange sometimes referred to as the Amarillo Junction. I-44 then passes west of the state fairgrounds and continues north to provide access to Bethany and Warr Acres. It then turns more eastbound before reaching a junction with I-235, which also signifies the northern end of I-235, and US-77 also known as the Broadway Extension, which connects Downtown Oklahoma City to Edmond. It then meets and follows a stretch of I-35, which it overlaps with until the Turner Turnpike interchange, where it takes an easterly turn again.

I-44 then follows the Turner Turnpike to Sapulpa, where it becomes a non-tolled road after meeting SH-66. I-44 bypasses downtown Tulsa; I-244 serves the downtown areas. After meeting the Creek Turnpike again on the eastside of the city, I-44 becomes a turnpike once again, gaining the Will Rogers Turnpike designation.

The Will Rogers Turnpike section serves many northeast Oklahoma towns, including Claremore, Vinita (where it passes under the world's former largest McDonald's), and Miami.

History
I-44 was designated through Oklahoma to replace the section of US-66 running from Oklahoma City to Joplin, Missouri. I-44 covered the already-existing Turner Turnpike and Will Rogers Turnpike, with a western terminus at I-35 in Oklahoma City, the current western terminus of the Turner Turnpike.

I-44 was assigned to the H. E. Bailey Turnpike in 1982, when I-44 was assigned to the western and northern legs of I-240 (then a semi-beltway around Oklahoma City) and the H. E. Bailey Turnpike as part of Oklahoma's "Diamond Jubilee" celebrations. Before I-44 was assigned to it, the freeway connector to the north end of the H. E. Bailey Turnpike was named the Will Rogers Expressway. The non-tolled section through Lawton was the Pioneer Expressway.

Westbound I-44 northeast of Tulsa was affected by a sinkhole found on June 2, 2010. Traffic was only affected for a short period of time and the roadway has since been reopened.

Southeast of Catoosa, I-44 was redesigned to have an interchange with the eastern expansion of the Creek Turnpike. A  stretch of the original roadbed remains; however, it is unused and is not maintained by the Oklahoma Department of Transportation (ODOT) or any of the surrounding cities. In 2012, the only bridge over the abandoned stretch, Pine Street, was removed and replaced with graded fill over the old turnpike.

As part of a project to widen I-235 and US-77 to accommodate the increase amount of traffic, its interchange with I-44/SH-66 was reconstructed from a cloverleaf interchange to a four-level interchange beginning in 2011. The project eliminated two cloverleaf ramps, widened the other two cloverleaves, and added two new flyover ramps. The four-level interchange was the first of its kind in Oklahoma. The project lasted 11 years and was opened on March 3, 2022. An additional $16 million is being provided to reconstruct the I-44 to US-77 ramp and provide a direct connection to North Lincoln Boulevard. The project is expected to be started in 2023.

I-44 is also known for being crossed by the 1999 Bridge Creek–Moore tornado on May 3, 1999, during the 1999 Oklahoma tornado outbreak, and by the 2013 Moore tornado on May 20, 2013, during the tornado outbreak of May 18–21, 2013.

On February 14, 2021, icy conditions caused a multi-vehicle pileup near Oklahoma City. Both eastbound and westbound lanes were shut down because of the incident.

The H. E. Bailey Turnpike section of I-44 was converted to cashless tolling via PlatePay and PikePass in Summer 2022. This was done to remove the need for toll plazas, which were seen as inefficient and prone to traffic accidents. The project, along with a project to rehabilitate the pavement between Lawton to the Oklahoma City metropolitan area, is being done in order to raise the speed limit from 75 mph to 80 mph.

Interstate 440

Interstate 440 (I-440) was the designation given to a stretch of Interstate Highway from I-240 to US-66 in Oklahoma City. It was a part of the original Grand Boulevard that had been built in compliance with Interstate Highway standards. In 1975, the American Association of State Highway and Transportation Officials (AASHTO) approved renumbering I-440 as I-240 to create a single numeric designation for the Oklahoma City loop. In 1982, as part of Oklahoma's "Diamond Jubilee", I-44's western terminus was moved from the I-35/I-44 junction near Edmond, Oklahoma, to the Texas–Oklahoma state line via the Belle Isle Freeway (part of the recently designated I-240 connecting the former I-440 with I-35); I-240, the H. E. Bailey Turnpike; and the turnpike connector road on the eastern edge of Lawton, Oklahoma.

Exit list

References

External links

44
 Oklahoma
Transportation in Cotton County, Oklahoma
Transportation in Comanche County, Oklahoma
Transportation in Caddo County, Oklahoma
Transportation in Grady County, Oklahoma
Transportation in McClain County, Oklahoma
Transportation in Cleveland County, Oklahoma
Transportation in Oklahoma County, Oklahoma
Transportation in Lincoln County, Oklahoma
Transportation in Creek County, Oklahoma
Transportation in Tulsa County, Oklahoma
Transportation in Tulsa, Oklahoma
Transportation in Rogers County, Oklahoma
Transportation in Mayes County, Oklahoma
Transportation in Craig County, Oklahoma
Transportation in Ottawa County, Oklahoma